Woad is the common name of Isatis tinctoria, a flowering plant also known as glastum.

Woad may also refer to:

Culture and entertainment 

 National Anthem of the Ancient Britons, also known as Woad, a humorous song popular in the 1920s.
 WOAD (AM), an American radio station.
 WRKS, a radio station (105.9 FM) licensed to Pickens, Mississippi, United States, which held the call sign WOAD-FM from January 2004 to July 2009
 Picts, referred to as woads in King Arthur (2004 film), a tribal confederation of peoples who lived in what is today eastern and northern Scotland during the Late Iron Age and Early Medieval periods,
 “Woads,” a slang term for the popular Wednesday college night at Toad’s Place, a historic nightclub adjacent to Yale University.

See also 
 Wode (disambiguation)
 Woady Yaloak River